Daniela Iraschko-Stolz ( Iraschko; born 21 November 1983) is an Austrian ski jumper and footballer.

She is one of the ski jumping's most successful female athletes, having won the 2014/15 women's World Cup season, and has the third most individual female World Cup wins – 12 – as of March 2017.

In football, she has played at the highest levels of the domestic women's game.

Career

Ski jumping
Iraschko-Stolz has competed in ski jumping since 2000. She is best known for her three individual victories at the Holmenkollen Ski Festival (2000, 2001, 2003). In 2009–10 she won the women's Continental Cup. She won the gold medal at the 2007 Winter Universiade in Turin, gold at the 2011 Ski Jumping World Championships in Holmenkollen, and silver at the 2014 Winter Olympics in Sochi. She has nine individual wins at the World Cup level and finished second overall in the first-ever women's World Cup season in 2011/12.

On 29 January 2003, Iraschko-Stolz became the first woman to fly over 200 metres during practice for a World Cup event on the ski flying hill in Kulm, a women's world record which still stands today.

Due to being injured, she was unable to compete in the Nordic World Championships 2013.

In 2014, she won a silver medal in the normal hill competition at the Winter Olympics in Sochi.

At the Nordic World Ski Championship 2015 in Falun, she won a bronze medal in the normal hill competition. At the Nordic World Ski Championship 2017 in Lahti, she won together with Michael Hayböck, Jacqueline Seifriedsberger, and Stefan Kraft the silver medal in the mixed team competition.

Football
Iraschko started playing association football at a young age and started her career at WSV Eisenerz in 1993. In 2003 she moved to the Bundesliga side Innsbrucker AC, and after the dissolution of the women's team in 2006 she moved to Wacker Innsbruck. In 2008, 2009 and 2010 she became Austrian runner-up with the team behind the champions SV Neulengbach, in 2009 and 2012 she was in the Austrian Cup final.

Honours and statistics

Ski Jumping World Cup

Standings

Wins

Austrian football
With Wacker Innsbruck:
2x Austrian Cup finalist: 2009, 2012
3x Austrian Bundesliga runner-up: 2008, 2009, 2010

Personal life
She married her lesbian partner in 2013.

References

External links

1983 births
Austrian female ski jumpers
Holmenkollen Ski Festival winners
Austrian LGBT sportspeople
Lesbian sportswomen
Living people
Ski jumpers at the 2007 Winter Universiade
Medalists at the 2007 Winter Universiade
FIS Nordic World Ski Championships medalists in ski jumping
Olympic ski jumpers of Austria
Ski jumpers at the 2014 Winter Olympics
Ski jumpers at the 2018 Winter Olympics
Ski jumpers at the 2022 Winter Olympics
Medalists at the 2014 Winter Olympics
Olympic silver medalists for Austria
Olympic medalists in ski jumping
People from Eisenerz
Universiade medalists in ski jumping
Universiade gold medalists for Austria
LGBT skiers
LGBT ski jumpers
World record setters in ski flying
Women's association football forwards
Austrian women's footballers
21st-century LGBT people
Sportspeople from Styria
Footballers from Styria
21st-century Austrian women